Spalerosophis is a small genus of snakes in the family Colubridae.

Geographic range
Member species are found in a wide range throughout Southern Asia, the Middle East, and North Africa.

Species
The following species six species are recognized as being valid.
Spalerosophis arenarius  – red-spotted diadem snake, red-spotted royal snake
Spalerosophis atriceps  – diadem snake, royal snake
Spalerosophis diadema  – diadem snake, royal snake
Spalerosophis dolichospilus  – Mograbin diadem snake, Werner's diadem snake
Spalerosophis josephscorteccii  – Scortecci's diadem snake
Spalerosophis microlepis  – Jan's diadem snake, zebra snake

References

Further reading
Jan G (1865). "Prime linee d'una fauna della Persia occidentale ". pp. 342–357. In: De Filippi F (1865). Note di un viaggio in Persia. Milan: G. Daelli. 369 pp. (Spalerosophis, new genus, p. 356). (in Italian).

 
Colubrids
Snake genera
Taxa named by Giorgio Jan
Taxonomy articles created by Polbot